Water polo at the 2009 World Aquatics Championships were held from July 19 to August 1, 2009, in Rome, Italy.

Medalists

Men

Women

References

External links
FINA Water Polo
Records and statistics (reports by Omega)

  
2009 in water polo
2009 World Aquatics Championships
2009
2009